Badlu (also Romanized as Bādlū, Badlū Bādellū, and Bādelū) is a village in Qaflankuh-e Sharqi Rural District, Kaghazkonan District, Meyaneh County, East Azerbaijan Province, Iran. At the 2006 census, its population was 68, in 22 families.

References 

Populated places in Meyaneh County